Michael Travis may refer to:

 Michael Travis, member of the band The String Cheese Incident
 Michael Travis (soccer) (born 1993), South African footballer
 Michael Travis (costume designer), American costume designer
 Mick Travis, a fictional English character played by Malcolm McDowell